The 1993 Federation Cup was the 31st edition of the most important competition between national teams in women's tennis. Spain defeated Australia in the final, giving Spain their 2nd title. This was Australia's first final since 1984.

Qualifying rounds
 Nations in bold qualified for the World Group.

Americas Zone

Venue: Palmas del Mar, Humacao, Puerto Rico (outdoor hard)

Dates: April 19–24

Participating Teams

Asia/Oceania Zone

Venue: National Tennis Centre, Colombo, Sri Lanka (outdoor clay)

Dates: May 4–5

Participating Teams

Europe/Africa Zone

Venue: City of Nottingham Tennis Centre, Nottingham, England (outdoor hard)

Dates: May 10–15

Participating Teams

World Group

Venue: Waldstadion T.C., Frankfurt, Germany (outdoor clay)

Dates: July 19–25

Draw

World Group play-offs

Venue: Waldstadion T.C., Frankfurt, Germany (outdoor clay)

Dates: July 22

The sixteen teams that lost in the World Group first round ties played off in eight randomly drawn ties. The winners remained in the World Group, while the losers were relegated to Zonal Competition in 1994.

External links 
 1993 Fed Cup 

 
Billie Jean King Cups by year
Federation
1993 in women's tennis